David Walsh Naughton (born February 13, 1951) is an American actor and singer known for his starring roles in the horror film An American Werewolf in London (1981) and the Disney comedy Midnight Madness (1980), as well as for a long-running "Be a Pepper" ad campaign for beverage maker Dr Pepper. He also starred in the short-lived sitcom Makin' It and sang its hit theme song "Makin' It", giving him a Top 5 hit on the Billboard charts.

Early life
Naughton was born in West Hartford, Connecticut, United States, the son of Rosemary (née Walsh) and Joseph Naughton, both of whom were teachers. He is the younger of two boys; his older brother is theater and film actor James Naughton. His family is Irish-American. Naughton attended the University of Pennsylvania and the London Academy of Music and Dramatic Art. Naughton was an Assistant Stage Manager and Understudy for the Broadway production of Hugh Leonard's Da.

Career
Naughton first became widely known as a result of his four-year stint (1977–1981) singing and dancing in television commercials and personal appearances to promote Dr Pepper. He starred in the sitcom Makin' It, and hit the Billboard Top Ten in 1979 with the sitcom's theme song, also titled "Makin' It." A US million selling disc, the track also peaked at No. 44 in the UK Singles Chart. 

He starred in the Disney comedy Midnight Madness (1980) followed by his lead role in the Academy Award-winning horror film An American Werewolf in London (1981) directed by John Landis. He also appeared in the television series My Sister Sam and also in episodes of MacGyver, Melrose Place, Murder, She Wrote, JAG and Seinfeld.

Filmography

Film

Television

Video games

Theatre

References

External links
 
 
 
 
 
 [ David Naughton] at AllMusic
 

1951 births
Living people
Male actors from Connecticut
American dance musicians
American male film actors
American people of Irish descent
American male television actors
People from West Hartford, Connecticut
University of Pennsylvania alumni
20th-century American male actors
21st-century American male actors
Alumni of the London Academy of Music and Dramatic Art